Sainte-Rose is a commune in the department of Guadeloupe. It is the second largest commune of Guadeloupe, in terms of area, after Petit-Bourg. Sainte-Rose lies on the coast of the island of Basse-Terre.

Population

Education
Public preschools include:
 Ecole maternelle Archelon
 Ecole maternelle Bourg 1 Ste-Rose
 Ecole maternelle Bourg 2
 Ecole maternelle Beauperthuy Daniel
 Ecole maternelle La Boucan
 Ecole maternelle Madame
 Ecole maternelle Viard

Public primary schools include:
 Ecole primaire Bis Cadet
 Ecole primaire La Boucan
 Ecole primaire Bourg 1 Ste-Rose
 Ecole primaire Bourg 2 Ste- Rose
 Ecole primaire Duzer
 Ecole primaire Reimonenq Joseph
 Ecole primaire Madame
 Ecole primaire Morne Rouge
 Ecole primaire Morne Zizi

Public junior high schools include:
 Collège Bébel
 Collège Bois Rada

Public senior high schools include:
 LGT Sonny Rupaire

See also
Communes of the Guadeloupe department

References

Communes of Guadeloupe